Anisleidy Galindo (born 21 September 1989) is a Cuban basketball player for Pinar del Río and the Cuban national team, where she participated at the 2014 FIBA World Championship.

She was a member of the team which competed for Cuba at the 2015 Pan American Games, winning a bronze medal.

References

1989 births
Living people
Cuban women's basketball players
Guards (basketball)
Place of birth missing (living people)
Basketball players at the 2015 Pan American Games
Pan American Games bronze medalists for Cuba
Pan American Games medalists in basketball
Medalists at the 2015 Pan American Games